Titus Lake is a small lake located east-southeast of the hamlet of South Worcester in Delaware County, New York. It is located on Titus Hill. Titus Lake drains south via an unnamed creek which flows into Middle Brook.

See also
List of lakes in New York

References 

Lakes of New York (state)
Lakes of Delaware County, New York